Stephen Bradley Saad (born June 1964) is a South African billionaire businessman, who is the founder and chief executive of Aspen Pharmacare, the largest producer of generic medicines in Africa.

Early life
Stephen Bradley Saad was born in June 1964 to Lebanese parents, and raised in Durban, South Africa. He attended the Durban High School in Durban. He graduated from the University of Natal, where he received a Bachelor of Commerce. He played rugby in Ireland and studied to become a chartered accountant.

Career
He started his career at Quickmed, a prescription drug distribution company in black townships during apartheid. At the age of twenty-nine, he sold his share in Covan Zurich for US$3 million, thus becoming a millionaire.

In 1997, together with Gus Attridge, he co-founded  Aspen Pharmacare, a public company traded on the Johannesburg Stock Exchange. It has become the largest producer of generic medicines on the African continent. He serves as its chief executive and Gus Attridge as its deputy chief executive, and serves on its board of directors. In 2011, he was worth US$640 million, becoming one of Africa's 40 richest people. His stock portfolio went up 75% in 2013. He is now worth US$1.4 billion.

Additionally, he chairs the Sharks, a rugby union club in Durban. He also sits on the board of trustees of his alma mater, the Durban High School. In 2014, he was awarded an honorary doctorate from Nelson Mandela Metropolitan University for the positive role of Aspen in the city of Port Elizabeth

Personal life
He resides in Durban and spends time at his private reserve in the Sabi Sand Game Reserve near the Kruger National Park. He is married with four daughters.

References

1964 births
Living people
People from Durban
University of KwaZulu-Natal alumni
South African people of Lebanese descent
South African businesspeople
South African billionaires
Businesspeople in the pharmaceutical industry